The United States Post Office is a historic post office building located at Little Valley in Cattaraugus County, New York. It was designed and built in 1941-1942 as a Works Progress Administration project, and is one of a number of post offices in New York State designed by the Office of the Supervising Architect of the Treasury Department, Louis A. Simon. It is a one-story symmetrically massed brick structure with a stone watertable in the Colonial Revival style.  Its design is the same as that used in 13 other post offices across New York State.

It was listed on the National Register of Historic Places in 1989.

Little Valley has had a post office in some form since October 15, 1822. It serves one ZIP Code, 14755, which covers the village and large portions of the towns of Napoli, Mansfield and west Salamanca (including Bucktooth and Sawmill Runs).

References

External links
Historical marker/historic landmark for US Post Office--Little Valley in Little Valley, NY

Little Valley
Colonial Revival architecture in New York (state)
Government buildings completed in 1942
Works Progress Administration in New York (state)
Buildings and structures in Cattaraugus County, New York
1942 establishments in New York (state)
National Register of Historic Places in Cattaraugus County, New York